The following buildings were added to the National Register of Historic Places as part of the Lake Wales MPS Multiple Property Submission (or MPS).

Notes

Lake Wales
National Register of Historic Places Multiple Property Submissions in Florida
Buildings and structures in Lake Wales, Florida